Chaos Sound is the tenth studio album by the American street punk band The Casualties. It was released in January 2016 on Season of Mist Records. The album was also the final album to feature longtime member Jorge Herrera on Vocals.

Track list

References

The Casualties albums
Season of Mist albums
2016 albums